Mechra Bel Ksiri is a town in Sidi Kacem Province, Rabat-Salé-Kénitra, Morocco. According to the 2010 census it has a population of 29,601.

References

Populated places in Sidi Kacem Province
Municipalities of Morocco